Paulo César Batista dos Santos (born 24 March 1968 in), known just as Paulão, is a former Brazilian footballer who played as a centre back.

An international for Brazil from 1990 to 1992, Paulão gained notability at Cruzeiro and Grêmio, where he won the 1994 Copa do Brasil with the Porto Alegre-side.

Career
Born in Itambacuri, Minas Gerais, Paulão started at Cruzeiro where he made his breakthrough, winning two Campeonato Mineiro in 1990 and 1992. He played alongside Adílson Batista, Paulo Roberto, Ademir and Ramon Menezes. Due to his performances at Cruzeiro, he received a call-up for the national team by Paulo Roberto Falcão in 1990. He made his debut on 12 September 1990 against Spain and his last on 16 December 1992, against Germany, counting eight caps during those two years; he still was part of the squad for the 1993 Copa América, but did not play.

In 1992, he moved to Grêmio, competing in the Supercopa Libertadores, lost to his former team, but winning the 1994 Copa do Brasil and the 1994 Campeonato Gaúcho. In 1994, he joined Benfica, intended as future replacement for Carlos Mozer. He made his debut on 21 August 1994 in a first tier match against Beira-Mar, and appeared regularly until late September, when he was sidelined in favour of Mozer.

He left the club in December 1994, signing with Vasco da Gama but stayed only one year, becoming a journeyman in next four years, passing through five clubs, before retiring. In 2007, he worked as assistant manager with Dorival Júnior, who was quoted saying: "I know Paulão, he used to play alongside me [at Grêmio] and is a person of my total confidence."

References 

Bibliography

Honours
Cruzeiro
Campeonato Mineiro: 1990, 1992

Grêmio
 Campeonato Gaúcho: 1993
 Copa do Brasil: 1994

Colo-Colo
 Primera División de Chile (2): 1996, 1997 Clausura

External links
 

1968 births
Living people
Brazilian footballers
Brazilian expatriate footballers
Brazil international footballers
1993 Copa América players
Cruzeiro Esporte Clube players
Grêmio Foot-Ball Porto Alegrense players
S.L. Benfica footballers
CR Vasco da Gama players
Clube Atlético Mineiro players
Guarani FC players
Club Athletico Paranaense players
Colo-Colo footballers
Associação Atlética Internacional (Limeira) players
Associação Atlética Ponte Preta players
Campeonato Brasileiro Série A players
Expatriate footballers in Chile
Expatriate footballers in Portugal
Sportspeople from Minas Gerais
Association football central defenders